Herbertson is a surname. Notable people with the surname include:

 Andrew John Herbertson (1865–1915), British geographer
 Betty Herbertson, Australian lawn bowler
 Helen Herbertson, Australian choregrapher, winner of the Kenneth Myer Medallion for the Performing Arts in 2007
 Robert Herbertson (1852–1940), Australian politician
 Samuel Herbertson (1889–1915), Scottish footballer